Nardin or Nardina (feminine form in Slavic countries) is the surname of the following people
Alberto Nardin (born 1990), Italian racing cyclist
Stelio Nardin (1939–2014), Italian football player
 Terry Nardin (born 1942), political theorist at the National University of Singapore